Nationality words link to articles with information on the nation's poetry or literature (for instance, Irish or France).

Events

Awards

Works published

United Kingdom
 Edward Lear, Nonsense Songs, stories, Botany, and Alphabets (published this year, although the book states "1871"; see also Book of Nonsense 1846, More Nonsense 1872, Laughable Lyrics 1877)
 William Morris, The Earthly Paradise, Part 4 (Parts 1 and 2 1868, Part 3 1869)
 Arthur O'Shaughnessy, An Epic of Women, and Other Poems
 Dante Gabriel Rossetti, Poems, including "Jenny" and a fragment of "The House of Life", exhumed from Elizabeth Siddal's grave
 James Joseph Sylvester, a mathematician, publishes The Laws of Verse
 Alfred Lord Tennyson, Idylls of the King with eight Idylls in the order Tennyson wanted at this point (see also Idylls of the King 1859, 1889, The Holy Grail 1869, "The Last Tournament" 1871, Gareth and Lynette 1872, "Balin and Balan" in Tiresias 1885)
 Augusta Webster, Portraits
 William Wordsworth, The Poetical Works of William Wordsworth: The Centenary Edition (see also Misfcellaneous Poems 1820, Poetical Works 1836, 1840, Poems 1845, Poetical Works 1857)

United States
 Bret Harte, Plain Language from Truthful James (a pirated edition titled The Heathen Chinee also appeared)
 James Russell Lowell, The Cathedral
 Epes Sargent, The Woman Who Dared

Other
 Estanislao del Campo, Collected Works, Spanish-language, Argentina
 Adam Lindsay Gordon, Bush Ballads and Galloping Rhymes, published the day before he died, Australia
 Comte de Lautréamont, pen name of Isidore Lucien Ducasse, Poésies, a prose work in two parts, the first on aesthetics and rejecting Romanticism, the second a collection of maxims rewritten to change their original meanings (see "Deaths" section, below)
 John Reade, Merlin's Prophecy and Other Poems, Canada.
 Giovanni Marradi, Canzone moderne, Italy

Births
Death years link to the corresponding "[year] in poetry" article:
 January 6 – Helen Power (died 1957), Australian
 January 29 – Süleyman Nazif (died 1927), Turkish poet and politician
 March 4 – Thomas Sturge Moore (died 1944), English poet, author, playwright, artist and long-term friend of W. B. Yeats
 May 22 – Eva Gore-Booth (died 1926), Irish
 July 1 – Inoue Kenkabō 井上剣花坊 pen name of Inoue Koichi (died 1934), Japanese, late Meiji, Taishō and early Shōwa period journalist and writer of senryū (short, humorous verse); surname: Inoue
 July 27 – Hilaire Belloc (died 1953), French-born English writer whose "cautionary tales" (humorous poems with a moral) are the most widely known of his writing
 October 10 – Louise Mack (died 1935), Australian poet, journalist and novelist
 October 22 – Lord Alfred Douglas (died 1945), English minor Uranian poet best remembered as a lover of the writer Oscar Wilde
 November 1 – Christopher Brennan (died 1932), Australian
 November 27 – Damodar Botadkar (died 1924), Indian, Gujarati-language poet
 Also:
 Va. Ba. Patavardhan (died 1921), Indian, Marathi-language critic and poet

Deaths
Birth years link to the corresponding "[year] in poetry" article:
 January 25 – David Bates, 60, American poet
 April 24 – Louisa Stuart Costello (born 1799), English miniature-painter, poet, historical novelist and travel writer
 June 11 – William Gilmore Simms, 64, Southern American poet, novelist and historian
 June 24 – Adam Lindsay Gordon, 36, Australian poet and jockey
 July 24 – Anders Abraham Grafström, 80, Swedish poet and historian
 November 24 – Comte de Lautréamont, pen name of Isidore Lucien Ducasse (born 1846), French
 December 22 – Gustavo Adolfo Bécquer (born 1836), Spanish Andalusian poet and short-story writer
 Also:
 William Livingston (Uilleam Macdhunleibhe) (born 1808), Scottish Gaelic poet
 Rasul Mir, Indian, Kashmiri-language poet

See also

 19th century in poetry
 19th century in literature
 List of years in poetry
 List of years in literature
 Victorian literature
 French literature of the 19th century
 Poetry

Notes

19th-century poetry
Poetry